Use Once and Destroy Me is a DVD filmed on the 2003 tour of Europe and the United States by Mondo Generator.  It was released on September 7, 2004 by Tornado Records. It is currently being distributed by Cargo Records Germany.

Chapters
 "Six Shooter" - Amsterdam, Holland
 "Here We Come" - Los Angeles, US
 "Ode to Clarissa" - Birmingham, England
 "Shawnette" - Hamburg
 "I Want You to Die" - Glasgow, Scotland
 "Scottish Girl" - Glasgow, Scotland
 "Detroit" - Manchester, England
 "F.Y.I.F." - Glasgow, Scotland
 "Jr. High Love" - Manchester, England
 "Backstage" - Hamburg
 "Allen's Wrench" - Hamburg & London
 "Do the Headright" - Hamburg
 "Unless I Can Kill" - Berlin, Germany
 "So High, So Low" - Manchester, England
 "13th Floor" - Berlin & Hamburg
 "Open Up and Bleed for Me" - Hamburg
 "Simple Exploding Man" - Hamburg
 "Backstage" - London, England
 Credits

Bonus footage
 "Miss Mary" - Portland, Oregon
 "So High, So Low" - Dallas, Texas (filmed at Lollapalooza)
 "Ya Me Voy" - Hamburg
 "Ode to Clarissa" - Los Angeles (features Dave Grohl on drums, Jeordie White and Josh Homme on guitars)

Personnel
Nick Oliveri - vocals
Brant Bjork - drums
Dave Catching - guitars
Molly McGuire - bass guitar
Deborah Viereck - photography and video
John Leamy - cover design
Bob Sexton - "Ode To Clarissa" bonus video

References

Live video albums
2004 video albums
Mondo Generator albums
2004 live albums